Early American currency went through several stages of development during the colonial and post-Revolutionary history of the United States. John Hull was authorized by the Massachusetts legislature to make the earliest coinage of the colony (the willow, the oak, and the pine tree shilling) in 1652.

Because few coins were minted in the Thirteen Colonies, which later became the United Colonies and then the United States, foreign coins like the Spanish dollar were widely circulated. Colonial governments, at times, issued paper money to facilitate economic activities. The British Parliament passed Currency Acts in 1751, 1764, and 1773 to regulate colonial paper money.

During the American Revolution, the Colonies became independent states. No longer subject to monetary regulations arbitrarily imposed by the British Parliament, the States began to issue paper money to pay for military expenses. The Continental Congress also issued paper money during the Revolution — known as Continental currency — to fund the war effort. To meet the monetary demands of the war, State and Continental governments printed large amounts of currency, leading to rapid depreciation. By the end of the war, these paper notes became effectively worthless. Additionally, British counterfeiting gangs contributed further to the decreased value. By its conclusion, only a few counterfeiters had been caught and preemptively hanged, for the crime.

Colonial currency
There were three general types of money in the Colonies of British America: the specie (coins), printed paper money and trade-based commodity money. Commodity money was used when cash (coins and paper money) were scarce. Commodities such as tobacco, beaver skins, and wampum, served as money at various times in many locations.

Cash in the Colonies was denominated in pounds, shillings, and pence. The value of each denomination varied from Colony to Colony; a Massachusetts pound, for example, was not equivalent to a Pennsylvania pound. All colonial pounds were of less value than the British pound sterling. The coins in circulation during the Colonial Era were, most often, of Spanish and Portuguese origin. For most of the 17th and 18th century, the Spanish dollar was one of the few widely accepted denominations by the people, which resulted in it serving as the colonists' interim currency. The prevalence of the Spanish dollar throughout the Colonies, led to the money of the United States being denominated in dollars, rather than pounds.

One by one, colonies began to issue their own paper money to serve as a convenient medium of exchange. In 1690, the Province of Massachusetts Bay created "the first authorized paper money issued by any government in the Western World". This paper money was issued to pay for a military expedition during King William's War. Other colonies followed the example of Massachusetts Bay by issuing their own paper currency in subsequent military conflicts. However, as the colonies began printing their own money, location-based socio economic issues soon followed. Most of these concerns were rooted in each colony having different values of the dollar, which made any inter-colony transactions a confusing mess. By the time Parliament decided to prohibit the printing of paper money in the colonies, their hired counterfeiters were able to take advantage of the common people, widening the gaps between socioeconomic classes.

The paper bills issued by the colonies were known as "bills of credit". Bills of credit could not be exchanged for a fixed amount of gold or silver coins upon demand, but were redeemable at a time specified in the future. Bills of credit were usually issued by colonial governments to pay debts. The governments would then retire the currency by accepting the bills for payment of taxes. When colonial governments issued too many bills of credit or failed to tax them out of circulation, inflation resulted. This happened especially in New England and the southern colonies, which, unlike the Middle Colonies, were frequently at war.  Pennsylvania, however, was responsible in not issuing too much currency, offering an example of a successful government-managed monetary system. Pennsylvania's paper currency, secured by land, generally maintained its value against gold from 1723 until the Revolution broke out in 1775.

This depreciation of colonial currency was harmful to creditors in Great Britain when colonists paid their debts with money that had lost value. The British Parliament passed several Currency Acts to regulate the paper money issued by the colonies. The Act of 1751 restricted the issue of paper money in New England. It allowed the existing bills to be used as legal tender for public debts (i.e. paying taxes), but disallowed their use for private debts (e.g. for paying merchants). In 1776, British economist Adam Smith criticized colonial bills of credit in his most famous work, The Wealth of Nations. 

Another Currency Act, in 1764, extended the restrictions to the colonies south of New England.
Unlike the earlier act, this act did not prohibit the colonies in question from issuing paper money but it forbade them to designate their currency as legal tender for public or private debts. That prohibition created tension between the colonies and the mother country and has sometimes been seen as a contributing factor in the coming of the American Revolution. After much lobbying, Parliament amended the act in 1773, permitting the colonies to issue paper currency as legal tender for public debts. Shortly thereafter, some colonies once again began issuing paper money. When the American Revolutionary War began in 1775, all of the rebel colonies, soon to be independent states, issued paper money to pay for military expenses.

Thirteen Colony set of United States Colonial currency

The Thirteen Colony set of colonial currency below is from the National Numismatic Collection at the Smithsonian Institution. Examples were selected based on the notability of the signers, followed by issue date and condition. The initial selection criteria for notability was drawn from a list of currency signers who were also known to have attended the 1765 Stamp Act Congress or signed the United States Declaration of Independence, Articles of Confederation, or the United States Constitution.

Continental currency

After the American Revolutionary War began in 1775, the Continental Congress began issuing paper money known as Continental currency, or Continentals. During the Revolution, Congress issued  in Continental currency.

The Continental Currency dollar was valued relative to the states' currencies at the following rates:
 5 shillings – Georgia
 6 shillings – Connecticut , Massachusetts, New Hampshire, Rhode Island, Virginia
 7 shillings – Delaware, Maryland, New Jersey, Pennsylvania
 8 shillings – New York, North Carolina
 32 shillings – South Carolina

Continental currency depreciated badly during the war, giving rise to the famous phrase "not worth a continental". A primary problem was that monetary policy was not coordinated between Congress and the states, which continued to issue bills of credit. "Some think that the rebel bills depreciated because people lost confidence in them or because they were not backed by tangible assets", writes financial historian Robert E. Wright. "Not so. There were simply too many of them." Congress and the states lacked the will or the means to retire the bills from circulation through taxation or the sale of bonds.

Another problem was that the British successfully waged economic warfare by counterfeiting Continentals on a large scale. Benjamin Franklin later wrote:

By 1780, the bills were worth  of their face value. Congress attempted to reform the currency by removing the old bills from circulation and issuing new ones, without success. By May 1781, Continentals had become so worthless that they ceased to circulate as money. Franklin noted that the depreciation of the currency had, in effect, acted as a tax to pay for the war.

For this reason, some Quakers, whose pacifism did not permit them to pay war taxes, also refused to use Continentals, and at least one Yearly Meeting formally forbade its members to use the notes. In the 1790s, after the ratification of the United States Constitution, Continentals could be exchanged for treasury bonds at 1% of face value.

After the collapse of Continental currency, Congress appointed Robert Morris to be Superintendent of Finance of the United States. Morris advocated the creation of the first financial institution chartered by the United States, the Bank of North America, in 1782. The bank was funded in part by bullion coins loaned to the United States by France. Morris helped finance the final stages of the war by issuing notes in his name, backed by his personal line of credit, which was further backed by a French loan of ,000 in silver coins. The Bank of North America also issued notes convertible into gold or silver. Morris also presided over the creation of the first mint operated by the U.S. government, which struck the first coins of the United States, the Nova Constellatio patterns of 1783.

The painful experience of the runaway inflation and collapse of the Continental dollar prompted the delegates to the Constitutional Convention to include the gold and silver clause into the United States Constitution so that the individual states could not issue bills of credit or "make any Thing but gold and silver Coin a Tender in Payment of Debts". However, in Juilliard v. Greenman the Supreme Court of the United States settled an ongoing and very heated debate on whether this restriction of issuing bills of credit was also extended to the Federal government:

See also

Economic history of the United States
Federal Reserve Note
History of economic thought
History of the United States dollar
Monetary policy
Money creation
United States dollar
Hyperinflation

References

Footnotes

These references have been removed from EH.Net ---

Flynn, David. "Credit in the Colonial American Economy". EH.Net Encyclopedia, edited by Robert Whaples. March 16, 2008.
Michener, Ron. "Money in the American Colonies". EH.Net Encyclopedia, edited by Robert Whaples. June 8, 2003.

Bibliography 
Allen, Larry. The Encyclopedia of Money. 2nd edition. Santa Barbara, Calif: ABC-CLIO, 2009. .
Flynn, David. "Credit in the Colonial American Economy". EH.Net Encyclopedia, edited by Robert Whaples. March 16, 2008.
Michener, Ron. "Money in the American Colonies". EH.Net Encyclopedia, edited by Robert Whaples. June 8, 2003.
Newman, Eric P. The Early Paper Money of America. 3rd edition. Iola, Wisconsin: Krause Publications, 1990. .
Newman, Eric P. The Early Paper Money of America. 5th edition. Iola, Wisconsin: Krause Publications, 2008. .
Wright, Robert E. One Nation Under Debt: Hamilton, Jefferson, and the History of What We Owe. New York: McGraw-Hill, 2008. .

Further reading 

Brock, Leslie V. The currency of the American colonies, 1700–1764: a study in colonial finance and imperial relations. Dissertations in American economic history. New York: Arno Press, 1975. .
Ernst, Joseph Albert. Money and politics in America, 1755–1775: a study in the Currency act of 1764 and the political economy of revolution. Chapel Hill: University of North Carolina Press, 1973. .

External links

Currency Issues to Overcome Depressions in Pennsylvania, 1723 and 1729
Creating the U.S. Dollar Currency Union,1748–1811: A Quest for Monetary Stability or a Usurpation of State Sovereignty for Personal Gain?

Banknotes of the United States
Historical currencies of the United States
Financial history of the United States

fr:Effet colonial